Surinder Singh Nijjar (7 June 1949 – 26 March 2021) was a British-Indian judge of the Supreme Court of India. Post-retirement, Nijjar practised as an arbitrator. Prior to his elevation as judge, Nijjar was a Senior Advocate and practised at the Punjab and Haryana High Court.

Early life and education
Nijjar was born in Bhar Singh Pura village of Punjab, India on 7 June 1947. Soon after his family moved to Huddersfield, England in 1962 where he completed his early education. Sometime later moved to Leeds to complete his A-Levels.

Started his legal career by obtaining his LL.B. degree from University College London in 1972.

Career
Soon after completion of his pupillage, he was called to the Bar by Middle Temple. Unable to secure a civil tenancy, due to the prevalent racism at the English Bar at that time, Nijjar returned to India. 

Enrolled as an Advocate in 1977 and practised constitutional, labour and commercial law at the Punjab and Haryana High Court. He got designated as Senior Advocate by the same Court in 1989. Before being elevated as judge, Nijjar also served as an Additional Advocate-General for the State of Punjab.

On 8 April 1996, Nijjar was elevated as an additional judge of the Punjab and Haryana High Court. He was transferred as an Additional Judge of the Bombay High Court and assumed charge on 26 April 1996. Later became a permanent judge of the same Court on 3 April 1998. He was then transferred back to Punjab and Haryana High Court and assumed charge on 7 August 2000.

Nijjar then took charge as Chief Justice of the Calcutta High Court on 7 March 2007. Soon after elevated as a Judge of the Supreme Court of India on 17 November 2009 and retired on 6 June 2014.

He was unanimously elected as 'Master of the Bench' of Middle Temple in 2011 and continued to hold this position until his demise.

Notable judgements
Several of his notable judgements included:
BALCO, Enercon India v. Enercon Gmbh 
Reliance Industries Ltd & Ors. v. Union of India 
Swiss Timing Ltd. v. Organising Committee, Commonwealth Games, 2010.

References

1949 births
2021 deaths
Alumni of University College London
Justices of the Supreme Court of India
Chief Justices of the Calcutta High Court
20th-century Indian judges
21st-century Indian judges